The 2021 Victorian Football League season was the 139th season of the Victorian Football Association/Victorian Football League Australian rules football  competition. The season commenced on 16 April was curtailed without a premiership awarded on 1 September 2021, due to the impact of the COVID-19 pandemic.

The 2021 season saw significant transition in the composition of the league, with the amalgamation of the North East Australian Football League into the VFL and resulting expansion interstate into New South Wales and Queensland. The league also underwent some shifts as a result of the financial fall-out from the first year of the pandemic, which had seen the 2020 season cancelled without a match played; and, a transition in league rules to strengthen its position as a pathway between underage and professional leagues.

The season was played during and disrupted by the ongoing pandemic, with several rounds of play cancelled owing to restrictions sporadically in place across the three states. The health-related restrictions imposed by the Victoria and New South Wales governments forced the league abandon the season before a finals series could be completed.  was recognised as the minor premier, but no premiership was awarded.

League membership

Amalgamation with the NEAFL
The North East Australian Football League had served as the top state-level league in New South Wales, the Australian Capital Territory, Queensland (and previously for the Northern Territory) since 2011. The NEAFL's utility as a development league and talent pathway had long suffered as a result of the substantial gap in standard between its weakest teams and players, its strongest teams and players, and AFL level – gaps which had been far more pronounced than in the VFL. The AFL clubs had long been keen for a higher quality league for their reserves teams to contest, and the AFL had been keen to improve the senior development pathways. The high costs of running the NEAFL also became acutely problematic due to the massive financial losses suffered by the football industry during the COVID-19 pandemic. As was the case for the VFL, the 2020 NEAFL season was cancelled due to the pandemic.

In August 2020, it was announced that the NEAFL would amalgamate into the VFL, with all of its clubs afforded the opportunity to join the VFL, over a transitional period in 2021 and 2022. This was expected to provide both the AFL clubs and the northeastern pathway clubs with a higher standard of competition, improving player development and senior pathways in the north east. Six of the NEAFL's nine teams joined the new competition: the Sydney reserves, Greater Western Sydney reserves, Brisbane reserves and Gold Coast reserves, and two stand-alone senior clubs from Queensland: Gold Coast based Southport Sharks and Brisbane based Aspley Hornets. Sydney based Sydney University was offered a licence before ultimately declining due to the cost to compete being too high. The Canberra Demons and Brisbane based Redland both declined to join the merged competition before licenses were offered.

The competition was referred to by the working title 'VFL/East Coast second-tier competition' in official correspondence during part of the offseason, before the 'Victorian Football League' was ultimately retained unchanged.

Changes to Victorian clubs
The financial pressures of the pandemic resulted in many AFL clubs seeking lower-cost reserves affiliation options. A new, lowest-cost option was made available to the AFL clubs, under which reserves players would be dispersed throughout the various VFL clubs rather than being affiliated to a single club, but no club took up the option.

This affiliation had been high cost for Carlton due to the large amount of money it had been investing in the club as a development pathway in the region. Carlton fielded its reserves team in the league for the first time since the 2002 season. Furthermore, the administration of the Northern Blues – which had initially announced that it would have to fold without Carlton's financial backing and was not included in the aborted plans for a shortened 2020 season – worked successfully through the year to find a means to remain viable as a stand-alone senior club, and returned to the league under its former Northern Bullants name, and in its traditional red and white colours.

Other notes
No Tasmanian team was introduced to the league in 2021 as part of the expansion interstate; although AFL Tasmania had gained a provisional licence in 2018 to re-establish a Tasmanian team in the VFL from 2021, plans for this were deferred during the pandemic.

The seven new clubs expanded the competition to a total of 22 clubs, the most to contest a VFA/VFL season since 1987, and the most ever to contest a VFA/VFL premiership in a single division.

The governing bodies took deliberate moves to strengthen the VFL's utility as a pathway league, through which undrafted players from the underage systems could continue to develop and then be drafted into the AFL system. In doing this, age restrictions were set requiring each team to field at least six under-22 players in each game. Under-age players will be allocated to clubs on a zoning basis, with each NAB League club and academy system allocated to a specific VFL club or clubs, thus allowing for greater interchange and continuity.

Annual grants from the AFL to the stand-alone VFL clubs, which had been introduced in 2000 when the AFL reserves first amalgamated with the VFL, were abandoned due to the financial pressures of the pandemic. The salary cap for the competition was also significantly reduced, from $380k to $200k, or $100k for AFL reserves teams or those with reserves affiliations. Interstate travel costs for the competition will be financed by the AFL, and the fixture for AFL-aligned teams was 80% aligned with the AFL fixture to allow for entire club playing squads to travel together.

The season saw a trial of positional restriction rules, under which each team was required to have two players inside each 50-metre arc at each boundary throw-in stoppages. The rule was intended to reduce around-the-ground congestion, and following its trial in the 2021 VFL season trial will be assessed for potential inclusion in the national Laws of the Game for 2022. When the trial was originally announced, the rules went further, requiring three players inside each 50-metre arc – including one in each goal square – at every kick-in and boundary throw-in; but this was relaxed after several pre-season practice matches and before the home and away season, after several AFL coaches remarked that the rules made it too difficult for players seeking to transition to AFL from the second-tier competition.

Broadcast coverage of the VFL was expanded, with three matches per round available on sports streaming service Kayo Sports, in addition to the ongoing one match per round broadcast on Seven Network and one Thursday night match broadcast on Fox Footy, where no Thursday night fixture in the AFL was scheduled.

Premiership season
The season was played during the second year of the COVID-19 pandemic. As the season began, Australia had largely settled into a paradigm of most states maintaining zero COVID-19 cases outside of their international travel quarantine systems; this allowed football games to be played in front of crowds, usually with reduced capacity, and unhindered interstate travel was permitted without quarantine. However, the different state governments often responded quickly to small numbers or even single virus cases being discovered in the community; this meant border restrictions or quarantine periods were at times re-introduced at short notice, impacting interstate travel for games; and, in some cases, that city- or state-wide lockdowns could be imposed within the impacted states, precluding football activities altogether.

The season's original fixture was set with each team playing 16 games over 19 rounds, with three byes per team designed to give the league some flexibility to accommodate cancelled and postponed games later in the season - followed by a four-week finals series played under the AFL final eight system which it had used since 2000. However, this was progressively reduced after lockdowns saw the cancellation of more games than could be made up. Lockdowns ultimately saw the cancellation of Victorian matches across a total of eight home and away rounds, with lockdowns in Queensland also impacting some matches there.

The Victorian lockdown which commenced on 6 August ultimately saw the season abandoned. Like the lockdowns which preceded it, it was originally expected to last for only one week. After two rounds were lost, it became impossible to for teams to play an equal number of home-and-away matches, each team ultimately playing between nine and eleven games each, resulting in the ladder being decided on match ratio for the first time since 1893. When the first round of the finals was lost, the finals were reduced to a simple eight-team knock-out tournament, with contingency to reduce further to a simple four-team knock-out tournament.  But, following the extension of the lockdown into October, the league formally announced on 1 September that the season was abandoned and no premiership would be awarded. The Footscray reserves team, which was unbeaten from ten home-and-away games, was recognised as minor premier.

Round 1

Round 2

Round 3

Round 4

Round 5

Round 6

Round 7

Round 8

Round 9

Round 10

Round 11

Round 12

Round 13

Round 14

Round 15

Round 16

Round 17

Round 18

Round 19

Ladder

(R) = Reserves teams to the AFL Seniors teams

Awards
 The J. J. Liston Trophy was not awarded due to the unequal number of games each team played.
 The Frosty Miller Medal was won by Matt Hammelmann (Aspley), who kicked 42 goals during the home-and-away season. In doing so, he became the first player from a wooden spooner to lead the VFA/VFL's goalkicking for a season.
 The Fothergill-Round-Mitchell Medal was won by Charlie Dean.

See also 
 List of VFA/VFL premiers
 Victorian Football League
 North East Australian Football League
 Australian Football League
 2021 AFL season
 2021 VFL Women's season

References

Victorian Football League seasons
VFL
VFL season